William Francis Spellacy (April 6, 1901 – November 15, 1960) was an American football end who played one season with the Buffalo All-Americans of the National Football League. He attended West Side High School in Rochester, New York.

References

External links
Just Sports Stats

1901 births
1960 deaths
Players of American football from New York (state)
American football ends
Buffalo All-Americans players
People from Corning, New York